The 1933 Penya Rhin Grand Prix was a Grand Prix motor race held at the Montjuïc circuit close to Barcelona in Catalonia, Spain, on 25 June 1933.

Classification

Fastest Lap: Tazio Nuvolari, 2m13.1

References

Penya Rhin Grand Prix
Penya Rhin
Penya Rhin Grand Prix